Baron Parker of Waddington may refer to either of two people, father and son:

Robert Parker, Baron Parker of Waddington (1857–1918), British law lord and Lord of Appeal in Ordinary
Hubert Parker, Baron Parker of Waddington (1900–1972), Lord Chief Justice of England and life peer, son of Robert Parker

Noble titles created in 1913
Noble titles created in 1958